John Lee Ka-chiu  (born 7 December 1957) is a Hong Kong politician and former police officer who is the 5th and current Chief Executive of Hong Kong. 

Originally a police officer, Lee served as the Deputy Commissioner of the Hong Kong Police Force from 2010 to 2012. He was appointed Under Secretary of Security by Leung Chun-ying in 2012. After Carrie Lam became Chief Executive in 2017, he was promoted to Secretary for Security. In 2021, he succeeded Matthew Cheung as Chief Secretary for Administration, a post which he served until 2022. A pro-Beijing politician, Lee is known as being a hardliner against the pro-democracy camp in Hong Kong, having played a key role in the crackdown of the opposition. 

As the sole candidate approved by China in the 2022 Hong Kong Chief Executive election, Lee was chosen as Hong Kong's next Chief Executive, taking office 1 July 2022. His selection was seen as a move by the Chinese government to focus further on security and further integrate Hong Kong with the mainland.

Early life 
In 1980, John Lee married Janet Lam at a young age, with whom he has two sons, Gilbert Lee Man-lung and Lee Man-chun. Lee did not attend university after secondary school.

Career

Police officer 
On 15 August 1977, at the age of 19, Lee joined the Royal Hong Kong Police Force as a probationary inspector. He became a Chief Inspector on 11 May 1984. He became Chief Superintendent in 1997, Assistant Commissioner in 2003, senior assistant commissioner in 2007 and Deputy Commissioner in 2010. Having served in a wide range of operational duties, including the CID, Complaints Against Police, Service Quality, Personnel, Training, Information Systems, Finance, Policies Formulation, Planning and Development, Lee had been the Commander of Kowloon West Region, Assistant Commissioner (Crime) and Director of Crime and Security, and Deputy Commissioner (Management).

During his tenure as a police officer, Lee obtained a master's degree in Public Policy and Administration from Charles Sturt University in Australia under a self-learning programme sponsored by the force.

Security Bureau 
Lee was appointed Under Secretary for Security in 2012 by chief executive Leung Chun-ying and promoted to Secretary for Security in July 2017 in Carrie Lam's administration.

In 2019, Lee played a key role in the push for the 2019 Hong Kong extradition bill.

On 3 July 2020, the Chinese state-run Xinhua News Agency stated that the Committee for Safeguarding National Security of the Hong Kong Special Administrative Region was formally established. There were 10 members of the committee. As the Secretary for Security of Hong Kong, Lee was a member of the committee.

In October 2020, Lee told Shenzhen Satellite TV in an interview that he was thankful for Beijing pushing through the National Security Law.

In December 2020, Lee defended the freezing of bank accounts belonging to former Democratic Party legislator Ted Hui, and said that other bank accounts, including those of suspect's relatives, could be frozen if they were believed to be related to a crime. 

In January 2021, after the arrest of 53 pro-democracy figures, Lee stated to the Legislative Council that they were arrested for "subverting state power". Lee also stated that "The Security Bureau strongly reaffirms and fully supports the Police's operation, which is resolute and professional." In addition, Lee stated that the opposition figures' attempts were "evil" and meant to "overthrow" the government. 

On 15 January 2021, Lee said that the new National Security Law would include police surveillance of communications, potentially giving the police more power to intercept and read communications.

In April 2021, Lee said that Hong Kong's disciplined services would adopt PLA-style goose step marching in order to demonstrate "nationalistic sentiments" and to "strengthen awareness of national security". In July 2022, Lee as Chief Executive said that "This time, we've comprehensively adopted the Chinese-style marching, which fully reflects the police's national identity and sense of belonging to the country, and also represents a solemn commitment to the trust bestowed by the nation, and loyalty to the country".

Chief Secretary 
On 25 June 2021, the HKSAR Government announced that the State Council has on the recommendation of the Chief Executive appointed Lee as Chief Secretary for Administration, making him the third former police officer after William Caine, the founding head of the Hong Kong Police Force who served as Colonial Secretary from 1846 to 1854, and Francis Henry May, Captain Superintendent of the Police Force from 1893 to 1901 and Colonial Secretary from 1902 to 1911, to have served in the second-highest governmental position in Hong Kong.

In January 2022, after the arrest of employees from Stand News, Lee said that US media groups should support law enforcement, claiming that "If you are genuinely interested in press freedom, you should support actions against people who have unlawfully exploited the media as a tool to pursue their political or personal gains".

On 4 March 2022, Lee invoked emergency regulation to announce the construction of a bridge linking Hong Kong with Shenzhen; however, satellite images showed that construction appeared to have begun 5 days before Lee had invoked the emergency regulation. The border is drawn at the halfway point in the Shenzhen River, and photos show that a barge was on the Hong Kong side on 27 February 2022. On the day of the emergency regulation was announced, photos show that the bridge was past the halfway point on Hong Kong's side, extending just meters away from Hong Kong land.

On 6 April 2022, Lee resigned and planned to join the 2022 Chief Executive election. His resignation was approved by the State Council of China on the following day.

Chief Executive (2022-present)

2022 Chief Executive election bid 

On 6 April 2022, Lee resigned and planned to join the 2022 Chief Executive election. His resignation was approved by the State Council of China on the following day. He formally announced his candidacy on 9 April 2022. Lee was the sole candidate who had the blessing of the Chinese leader Xi Jinping's administration in the 2022 Hong Kong Chief Executive election, which was communicated by the Liaison Office. The Office reportedly told the Election Committee that Lee would be the only candidate given permission by Beijing to be Chief Executive.

Lee's campaign manager, Tam Yiu-chung, revealed that Lee would develop a political manifesto by the end of April. Tam later claimed that the political manifesto would not be key for the public to support Lee. Lee dismissed criticism that the Election Committee members were nominating him without seeing his manifesto, claiming that the Election Committee members already knew him and could trust him. Despite having no competitors in the election, Lee said that the election run was "not easy".

FactWire reported that Lee's two sons (Gilbert Lee and Jacky Lee) have business relationships with Election Committee members, but Lee said there was no conflict of interest. In the report, FactWire said that Gilbert Lee's direct manager is Diana Ferreira Cesar, who sits on the finance subsector of the Election Committee. Additionally, Jacky Lee is a business partner of Li Sing-tui, an ex-officio member of the Election Committee. Lee violated the Election Ordinance by submitting late paperwork, but was exempted from penalty in August 2022. For Lee's election forum, seven media stations will cohost the broadcast, with one politician criticizing plans for it, stating that questions are restricted, with no audience member interaction, and the forum being pre-recorded rather than live.

Appointment 
Lee was the sole approved candidate, and of 1,461 Election Committee voters, 8 rejected him, 4 cast blank ballots, and 33 did not vote. He was formally appointed by premier Li Keqiang on 30 May 2022 and the cabinet he nominated was approved by the State Council of China on 19 June. 
He was officially sworn in on the 1 July 2022, becoming the third Hong Kong leader with a police background, the others being William Caine and Sir Francis Henry May, who served as acting Governor and Governor of Hong Kong, respectively.

Domestic Policy

Housing 
In June 2022, the Hong Kong and Macau Affairs Office, the Beijing government's office that manages policy around Hong Kong, specifically said that it hoped Lee would tackle the deep-rooted issue of housing in Hong Kong, with more explicit targets, more courage, and more action. On 1 July 2022, Chinese leader Xi Jinping also called on affordable housing to be a priority for Lee's government. On 3 July 2022, Lee said that if the housing supply did not meet targets, both civil servants and government leaders would be responsible. On 19 October 2022, he announced several measures to combat the housing prices. including building 72,000 private residential units over the next five years. Lee has said that he respected the plan to build public housing on parts of the Hong Kong Golf Club's site in Fanling.

National education 
In July 2022, Lee said that the government would spare no effort to enhance patriotic education, and said that national identity and nationalism would need to be fostered to students from an early age. In August 2022, Lee said that schools must teach students to respect and safeguard national security. In September 2022, Lee said that teachers would be required to "be cautious" about their conduct, set a "sense of national identity" with students, and also emphasized that "Newly appointed teachers in all public sector schools will be required to pass the Basic Law Test."

Public hospitals 
In his policy address, Lee said that the government may implement a minimum period of time in which healthcare professionals must work at a public hospital before they can leave. This caused an uproar among healthcare professionals, according to the president of the Hong Kong Public Doctors' Association.

In November 2022, Lee said of the policy "I believe the professionals hold strong affection for Hong Kong and are willing to serve the society." In contrast, John Tsang said that the policy "will only lead more medical professionals to leave Hong Kong."

On 11 November 2022, Health Secretary Lo Chung-mau revealed that the plan would include doctors, nurses, and dentists.

Transportation 
In his 2022 Chief Executive Policy Address, Lee announced the Government would prioritise three rail projects and three road projects to improve transport infrastructure and connectivity in Hong Kong. It was reported that all six of these projects would begin consultation later in the year.

The Tseung Kwan O line would extend southwards to the New Development Area of Tseung Kwan O Area 137. As part of the development of Area 137, a new road tunnel would be built from Tseung Kwan O to Yau Tong. In addition, he recommended the construction of Hong Kong‑Shenzhen Western Rail Link, a railway line connecting Hung Shui Kiu to Qianhai, Shenzhen, and the Central Rail Link between Kam Tin and Kowloon Tong via Kwai Chung. 

A new highway, the Northern Metropolis Highway, would improve connectivity between Tin Shui Wai and Kwu Tung North increasing road capacity between the Northern Metropolis. A new trunk road between Tai Po and Kowloon West would bypass Sha Tin and relieve congestion from the Tolo Highway.

CBD 
In September 2022, Lee said that "Cannabis is a drug, and the government will categorise CBD as a dangerous drug... to protect the public's health." The move to ban CBD by February 2023 would put it in the same category as heroin, cocaine and methamphetamine.

Emigration wave 
During his leadership, Lee attempted to reverse the emigration wave in Hong Kong triggered by the imposition of the National Security Law in 2020, as well as the strict zero-COVID curbs. On 19 October 2022, he gave a 2 hour 45 minute long speech, saying that Hong Kong would "snatch" global talent. He accordingly released seven measures, including granting graduates from the world's top 100 universities a two-year visa, allowing employers to hire overseas talent more easily, extend employment visas and refund extra stamp duty to foreigners-turned-permanent residents who are still holding property. However, the exodus continued throughout the year, with the government announcing in 2023 that the total of the population fell by 0.9% compared to a year earlier.

COVID-19 pandemic 
On 5 July 2022 in his first ever weekly news conference as the Chief Executive, Lee said that Hong Kong would look into easing COVID-19 health protocols, shortening the quarantine period in particular. However, he also stressed the aim to prevent the spread of COVID-19 and hospitals from being overwhelmed. He also expressed his awareness for Hong Kong to remain open and convenient to travellers but the risks posed by the pandemic should also be taken into considerations at the same time. In addition, he revealed that he had instructed Secretary of Health Lo Chung-mau to consider the possibility of the move.

On 1 September 2022, Lee announced after his videoconference that people would be allowed to "reverse quarantine" in Hong Kong for 7 days before traveling to Guangzhou. Asked about quarantine-free travel to mainland China, Lee said "This proposal of doing quarantine in Hong Kong so as to fulfil the seven-plus-three requirement in Shenzhen is in no replacement of other measures that we always try to seek so as to allow more convenience in allowing people to travel from Hong Kong to the mainland."

On 6 September 2022, Lee denied that government officials were in disagreement over pandemic measures with Bloomberg reporting that some officials hoped to end quarantine by November 2022. On 12 September 2022, SCMP reported that Hong Kong's health experts had been issued clear rules by Lee's administration, stating that they should not express conflicting opinion's against the government's official positions. This came after the government's COVID-19 Expert Advisory Panel, composed of six medical specialists, had several members who suggested gradually lifting COVID-19 restrictions, including removing hotel quarantine by November 2022.

On 8 September 2022, Lee's administration announced that children as young as 5 years old would need to be vaccinated to eat in restaurants; it is one of the few places in the world that requires vaccination for children. A study released in October 2022 showed that 85% of parents in Hong Kong disagree with vaccinating their children.

On 13 September 2022, Lee held a press conference, where he addressed concerns that people coming from mainland China to Hong Kong did not need to be vaccinated. Lee stated that mainland China had few cases and did not pose a risk, though Hong Kong averaged between 8,000 and 10,000 cases per day; Lee did not address the risk of unvaccinated mainland Chinese catching COVID-19 while in Hong Kong. A day later on 14 September 2022, lawmaker Michael Tien criticized the lack of mandatory vaccination for those coming from mainland China, saying that the lack of vaccination could increase their risk of infection in Hong Kong and place strain on the city's healthcare system. Another doctor, Joseph Tsang Kay-yan, chairman of the Medical Association's advisory committee on communicable diseases, echoed Tien's comments against what Lee said, stating "The risk of travellers from the mainland getting Covid in Hong Kong is high. They need to balance this. If they are infected here, will they occupy our public healthcare system? Will it tighten the supply of isolation wards?" On 16 September 2022, the government backtracked on Lee's statement and announced that arrivals from mainland China, Macau, and Taiwan would need to be vaccinated in order to receive a vaccine pass.

Lee also vowed to host a "successful financial summit" in November 2022 (the Global Financial Leaders' Investment Summit) and that reducing quarantine would require more data. During the press conference on 13 September 2022, Lee warned against comparing the flu against COVID-19, claiming that COVID-19 was 6 times more deadly than the flu, and stating that the situation was still "critical". A day later, medical experts disagreed with Lee's data and estimated COVID-19's fatality rate at 0.098%, lower than the 0.1% recorded for the flu. Dr. Joseph Tsang Kay-yan also mentioned that the death rate of 0.098% could be even lower in reality, due to citizens not reporting their infections, plus an accounting difference, where people who die with COVID-19 are counted as a COVID-19 death, even if the underlying cause of death was not due to COVID-19.

In September 2022, the Hong Kong Association of Athletics Affiliates, organizer of the Standard Chartered Hong Kong Marathon 2022 issued an ultimatum to the government, stating that they would have to cancel the marathon if there were no government approval by 16 September 2022. The date passed without government approval and the event was cancelled; Lee later said "we feel disappointed that the organizer made the decision before the government's reply."

On 20 September 2022, Huang Liuquan, an official at the Hong Kong and Macau Affairs Office, made a speech which the Chinese Association of Hong Kong and Macau Studies interpreted as Beijing granting Lee permission to open Hong Kong's international borders.

On 21 September 2022, Lee said that Hong Kong is a "highly open, international city in the Greater Bay Area", though SCMP noted that the region has been mostly cut off from the outside world since early 2020 due to travel restrictions. Frederick Ma Si-hang, a former Secretary for Commerce and Economic Development, also called Hong Kong "isolated".

On 23 September 2022, Lee said Hong Kong was still aligned with the "dynamic zero-Covid" strategy. A day later, the Centre for Health Protection said Hong Kong is unlikely to achieve zero-Covid.

On 1 October 2022, Lee said Hong Kong would not "lie flat" when fighting COVID-19. On 8 October 2022, Lee said that differences of opinion should not detract from fighting the virus.

On 11 October 2022, reporters pointed out that the third-jab rate in Hong Kong and Singapore were similar with Singapore having dropped many COVID-19 measures compared to Hong Kong, but Lee said he would not compare anti-epidemic efforts between the two cities due to differences in healthcare systems and culture, and would continue to hold steady on Hong Kong's "0+3" scheme for inbound travelers. Lee also said that removing all travel restrictions would first require the government to consider many "uncertain factors".

On 18 October 2022, Lee said that the government should be careful when further easing COVID-19 restrictions, that a gradual approach was necessary, and that the government would be careful of new variants. Lee also said that the government was working with mainland China to "iron out some challenges" in regards to quarantine-free cross-border travel, and said that details had not been hashed out, stating "I will have to wait for further ideas from our mainland counterparts so that we can really work out the details."

On 20 October 2022, Lee was questioned by lawmaker Michael Tien on why his policy address "made no mention of the [proposed] 0+0 measure and a roadmap of returning to normalcy," with Tien also saying "You used a lot of paragraphs to talk about attracting talent, hosting large-scale exhibits and international events, but these rely on the number of overseas arrivals. And you know these people are most resistant to Hong Kong's anti-epidemic policies."

On 21 October 2022, Lee was asked by citizens when the mask mandate would be over, with Lee responding that he would do so only if the child vaccination rate reached a satisfactory level, but did specify the numerical percentage.

On 23 October 2022, after the High Court ruled that the government had no power to invalidate vaccine pass exemptions, Lee said "We just had a case in which the government was sued and lost. Hong Kong has no human rights? That's impossible!" The government later changed the law after losing the case to give itself power to invalidate the vaccine passes. On 1 November 2022, Lee was asked about whether changing the law rather than accepting the High Court's decision sent the wrong message about rule of law in Hong Kong, to which Lee said the question was misleading and that changing the law was "is in full compliance with the principle of the rule of law".

On 1 November 2022, Lee said that under the "0+3" scheme, Hong Kong was "full of life". On that day, he also said that Financial Secretary Paul Chan would have to take a PCR test upon arrival in Hong Kong, and will have to isolate if he tests positive; Lee stressed that Chan would not be allowed any exemptions. On 2 November 2022, SCMP reported that Chan tested positive with his PCR test, but did not have to isolate, contradicting Lee's earlier remarks.

On 8 November 2022, Lee said that the mask mandate and vaccine pass health code system would be here to stay. When asked about reducing the "0+3" policy to "0+0," Lee deflected and said that authorities are constantly reviewing its policies.

On 15 November 2022, Lee said that people should not fixate on dropping restrictions, and that "Everyone has a different understanding of '0+0'. Therefore, I am not going to describe whether we are in [a stage] of "zero-plus-what"." Respiratory expert Ho Pak-leung disagreed and said that the government should cancel restrictions and that "Two months since 0+3 came into place, the government has been offering piecemeal adjustments every Thursday - that's not opening up. The government should open up in one go." On 19 December 2022, Ho again called for the government to cut all ineffective measures, such as testing and isolation.

On 24 November 2022, SCMP released an editorial, stating "When Chief Executive John Lee Ka-chiu was freely enjoying the hospitality of Thailand during a visit to Bangkok over the weekend, members of a tour group from the country were having lunchboxes in their hotel rooms in Hong Kong" due to government restrictions in Hong Kong.

In December 2022, a month after Lee told the public to forget about "0+0," Lee was given the "green light" by Beijing to move the city to "0+0" and did so as soon as he had the permission by Beijing to do so. Lee did not consult the Command and Coordination Group that he earlier created, before making the decision. David Hui Shu-cheong, a member of the group, said that the group had not met for months, and that the sudden relaxation of restrictions could add pressure to the local healthcare system. On 28 December 2022, after dropping some pandemic restrictions, Lee said that "In fact, I think society as a whole is preparing because I have been hearing a lot of voices saying this is the thing to be done."

In January 2023, Lee said that he opposed an independent investigation into the government's handling of the pandemic, an idea supported by health experts. Lee noted that Singapore had around 1,700 deaths from the virus, much fewer than Hong Kong's approximately 13,000 deaths.

In February 2023, when asked on why mainland Chinese no longer had to take PCR tests when coming to Hong Kong, despite accounting for most of the imported cases in the city, Lee said "We have imported cases, but the overall risk is manageable."

In February 2023, Lee twice said there were "no restrictions" with COVID-19, despite the city having a mandatory mask mandate. In mid-February, when asked when the mask mandate would end, Lee said he would get advice from "relevant people."

Mainland China border 
Lee has met with mainland Chinese authorities multiple times to discuss COVID-19 and reopening the Hong Kong - mainland China border without quarantine, both as Chief Secretary and Chief Executive. In September 2021, he led a delegation to Shenzhen for a meeting. He did so again in November 2021, and again in February 2022. In August 2022, Lee said that he has had "good dialogue" on fully reopening the border, without providing an estimate on when the border would be opened. In August 2022, Lee was scheduled for another meeting with authorities in mainland China, but did not elaborate on the reopening plan or timetable, saying that "It is better to announce the details when we have reached a certain stage of agreement, otherwise the information will be confusing." Lee cancelled his physical trip on 31 August 2022 and opted for a videoconference instead, and said "We will discuss the cross-border arrangement for residents in Hong Kong and mainland China and I hope that, after thorough discussion, a consensus can be reached." Lee also said "Of course, during our discussion, we will weigh out different options" and "we will actively consider any options". In December 2022, Lee said that talks with mainland authorities on quarantine-free travel had recently restarted again. SCMP reported that in December 2022, Lee would go to Beijing to further discuss the quarantine-free reopening of the border with mainland China.

In December 2022, Lee said that "I can now announce that the much-awaited reopening of the border with the mainland can now be achieved" in January 2023, though Tam Yiu-chung warned that it would be opened in a gradual manner and not fully. On 8 January 2023, Lee said that he would strive for a full reopening of the border, without a quota.

As part of border reopening plans, those from overseas are required to be vaccinated against COVID-19, but those from mainland China will not be required to be vaccinated. Medical experts Ho Pak-leung and Leung Chi-chiu both disagreed with the vaccination exemption and suggested that those coming from mainland China should be vaccinated as a condition to enter Hong Kong, to prevent the local healthcare system from being overloaded. Lawmaker Michael Tien also said that unvaccinated mainland visitors "would actually increase congestion in terms of the availability of beds in our public hospitals."

In January 2023, a government spokesperson said that all travelers from Hong Kong to mainland China would need a PCR test, including children and babies; however, children under 3 years old traveling from mainland China to Hong Kong would not need the PCR test. Lee said he "will communicate" with mainland authorities on the discrepancy.

Taiwan 
In August 2022, after Nancy Pelosi visited Taiwan, Lee said "According to media reports, when Nancy Pelosi was in Taiwan, she ignored the successful implementation of One Country, Two Systems in Hong Kong and maliciously criticised Hong Kong's democracy and freedom." Later, Lee endorsed a document Beijing published called "The Taiwan Question and China's Reunification in the New Era". Lee and other government officials were criticized by Lew Mon-hung for "crossing the line" with his statements on Taiwan, as the Basic Law stipulates that diplomatic affairs of Hong Kong are to be handled by mainland China's Foreign Ministry.

Policy address 
According to analysis of government press releases in August 2022, Lee did not hold a press conference for 7 straight weeks, the longest break of any Chief Executive in more than 10 years.

On 1 October 2022, Lee said that Xi Jinping's speech on 1 July 2022 would provide the blueprint for his cabinet's governance.

During his election campaign, Lee promised to release "key performance indicators" and initial ideas on alleviating public housing wait times within his first 100 days in office. On 8 October 2022, the first 100 days had been reached, and Lee had not yet made public announcements on either promise.

A survey released beforehand showed that 49% of people had no-to-low expectations for Lee's policy address. After his policy address, Lee's satisfaction rate for the address was 33.7%, the lowest out of all maiden speeches given by Chief Executives in Hong Kong.

On 19 October 2022, Lee's policy address included measures to prohibit insulting the flag of Hong Kong, update the Civil Service so that employees practice the principle of "patriots administering Hong Kong", fund HK$60m in "national education" for kindergartens, and conduct a review on District Councils so that they follow the "patriots-only" principle. When speaking about the Civil Service, Lee said that "There are a number of black sheep in our civil servant force that should be excluded."

Lee also pledged to build 30,000 Light Public Housing (LPH) units within the next 5 years, units meant for temporary stays of around 5 years and not meant as a long-term solution, unlike traditional public housing. Lee also said he would aim to reduce the wait for public housing from 6 years to 4.5 years within the next 4 years, using a new composite index that would track both LPH and traditional public housing wait times. The Democratic Party warned that the traditional public housing wait times would not be decreased with the introduction of LPH units, and also said that the government was "playing with words and maths" since LPH tenants would still have to be relocated to traditional public housing at the end of their leases. A member of the Liber Research Community also questioned the new metric and temporary housing, stating "Light Public Housing will increase the number of public flats and the wait may seem shorter. But these are just transitional housing supply and it is not "real" public housing." Lawmaker Tik Chi-yuen also raised similar concerns, saying that "So this does not achieve the ultimate aim [of obtaining public housing]. You are just moving people from one place to another. It is just buying time." Lee later said that the LPH and composite index were not meant to "dress up" and lower waiting time statistics. The Housing Authority recommended that the goal for wait times should be 3 years rather than the 4.5 set by Lee. A day after the policy address, officials later admitted that the LPH scheme was created because there was a failure to boost public housing in the next 5 years. The LPH scheme incurred questions from citizens and netizens, saying that the 30,000 units were making up public housing supply numbers. An editorial by SCMP also mentioned criticism of the playing with numbers.  

On 20 October 2022, Lee participated in a phone-in session with radio stations, where one caller addressed "harsh policies", stating "Hong Kong's always had a lot of talents. It was until the unrest that made people leave. Why are talents leaving? We all know full well. It's not about studying elsewhere or whatever. It's because harsh policies are stronger than tigers... We love freedom in a metropolis like Hong Kong. And we love China, but I dare say it doesn't love us. Japan, the US and the UK all let us in freely. Why are there so many rules [for entering the mainland]? Chief Executive, you know full well, you just wouldn't accept it."

On 23 October 2022, Lee defended Secretary for Labour and Welfare Chris Sun, who criticized a cartoonist that made fun of Lee's plans to attract talent to move to Hong Kong.

Collusion 
On 20 October, Lee said "First, the so-called "collusion" mentioned in the question just now is a term used to stir up social conflict during the period of anti-China strife  in Hong Kong, and we have to oppose such destructive discourse of sowing dissension and stirring up conflicts... "Collusion" between X and Y mentioned earlier [by Ambrose Lam] is a deliberate attempt to create social division and contradictions." According to Lee, there is an association between collusion with anti-government protest, whereas some government projects, such as Cyberport, were awarded to a single developer and created complaints of collusion.

Human rights

Glory to Hong Kong 
In November 2022, Glory to Hong Kong was played during a rugby match in Incheon, between the Hong Kong and South Korea rugby teams. Lee said that the "song that was played was closely connected to the 2019 violence and disturbances, and advocacy for Hong Kong's independence," and said that the Organised Crime and Triad Bureau would investigate the matter. In December 2022, Lee said that he would ask Google to remove the song from search results when querying for the national anthem of Hong Kong. After Google denied the request, Lee said that there was a legal basis for Google to do so.

Jimmy Lai 
After the Department of Justice lost multiple appeals in an attempt to block Jimmy Lai from hiring Tim Owen as his lawyer, Lee said that he would ask Beijing's National People's Congress Standing Committee (NPCSC) to interpret the national security law to potentially disallow the hiring of foreign lawyers in national security cases. Earlier, three Court of Final Appeal judges, including Chief Justice Andrew Cheung had ruled that Lai be allowed to hire Owen. Lee dismissed concerns that his move to ask the NPCSC to rule in the matter would damage the city's legal reputation, but professor Johannes Chan Man-mun, former law dean of HKU, said that the NPCSC interpretation "may severely compromise Hong Kong as an international city."

Lee also said "The most appropriate way forward is for the NPCSC to issue an interpretation and the case is handled accordingly. This is the approach that is in the best interest of this case and our legal system." When asked about if the decision to get the NPCSC involved would be unfair to Lai, Lee did not comment.

On 28 December 2022, Lee thanked Beijing for including the NCPSC interpretation on their next meeting's agenda. On 30 December 2022, the NPCSC ruled that the Chief Executive now has permission to decide whether or not defendants could hire foreign lawyers; Lee welcomed the ruling and said that foreign lawyers could be a threat due to them coming from "hostile" countries.

In January 2023, Lee said that the Committee for Safeguarding National Security, a committee he chairs, supported changing local laws to potentially ban foreign lawyers from national security cases.

Press freedom 
In April 2022, Lee said that there was no need to defend freedom of the press, claiming that it already exists. In contrast, a poll done by the Hong Kong Public Opinion Research Institute (HKPORI)  interviewed 1,004 people from April 2022 and showed that citizens' satisfaction with freedom of the press had dropped to a new record low.

On 22 September 2022, Lee told "patriotic" journalists at an event to "deliver Hong Kong's latest developments and correct message." Lee warned journalists to distance themselves from "bad elements" that "destroy press freedom", and also said freedom of speech and press were "adequately protected" by the Basic Law. Lee also warned journalists to stay away from unnamed "camouflaged media", to which Ronson Chan, head of the Hong Kong Journalists Association, said "Making such a serious accusation without naming the organisations is not a responsible practice."

A survey released on 23 September 2022 showed that faith in press freedom had dropped to a record low, with 93% of respondents citing the government as the source of suppression.

In November 2022, after Bao Choy had her appeal rejected, Lee said press freedom was "in the pocket of the people of Hong Kong" and protected by the Basic Law.

Article 23 
On 12 April 2022, Lee stated that implementing security legislation under Article 23 of the Basic Law would be a top priority for him. Lee later said in July 2022 that he preferred not to rush the law, which some saw as backtracking on his election pledge. The legislation was put on the back burner and was not scheduled for Legislative Council discussion in 2022.

In January 2023, after meeting with Xia Baolong, who asked that the Lee administration revise local legislation to keep it aligned with the national security law, Lee said that he would once again prioritize legislation under Article 23 as soon as possible.

On 17 January 2023, Lee said that the legislation would cover spying and people pretending to be journalists, who produce "fake news." Lee also said that the government would prevent "foreign agents" from entering the city, but did not specify how.

In February 2023, after several pro-Beijing figures said the legislation should wait until after Taiwan's 2024 elections, Lee said his "position remained unchanged" and he would move forward with the legislation.

Foreign relations 
In February 2023, Lee took a trip to the Middle East; later, he wrote an article in SCMP, saying that "Our key message, of course, was that Hong Kong was fully back in business." Earlier, Lee said that he would try his best on the trip to encourage Saudi Aramco to pursue a secondary IPO in Hong Kong. Lee said that his meeting with Aramco was "very positive."

Personal life 
Lee's wife and two children hold U.K. citizenship, and therefore Lee is eligible to claim U.K. citizenship as well. Lee himself had U.K. citizenship until 2012, when he relinquished it in order to take the Under Secretary for Security position.

After their elder son, Gilbert Lee Man-lung, was born, Lee married his wife, Janet Lam Lai-sim, in 1980. Lee was 22 years old at the time of his marriage. Both Gilbert Lee and the younger son, Jacky Lee Man-chun, attended Wah Yan College. In June 1990, John was nominated by then-12-years-old son and won the "Top 10 Modern Fathers".

Lee was awarded the Silver Bauhinia Star by the Hong Kong SAR Government in 2017.

He has a domestic helper, who in February 2022, tested positive for COVID-19.

When asked in April 2022, Lee did not respond to questions on whether he is Catholic. The following month, he said that he is Catholic.

He is nicknamed "Pikachu" by the Hong Kong anti-establishment faction, as it sounds similar to his Cantonese name "Lee Ka-chiu".

According to his August 2022 declaration of interests, Lee is a "Distinguished Member" of the Hong Kong Club.

Health 
In 2021, Lee had surgery to remove plane warts from his neck.

In November 2021, Lee had his 3rd dose of the Sinovac vaccine. In November 2022, Lee's spokesman said that Lee had tested negative on RAT tests, but positive on a PCR test upon landing in Hong Kong. The statement did not mention if Lee had symptoms or not. Lee was given antiviral drugs, and two members of Lee's entourage, Carol Yip, Director of the Chief Executive's Office, and Priscilla To, Lee’s private secretary, were deemed close contacts.

Sanctions
In August 2020, Lee and ten other officials were sanctioned by the United States Department of the Treasury under Executive Order 13936 by President Trump for undermining Hong Kong's autonomy. He owns a flat at King's Park Villa in Ho Man Tin, bought in 1997 for HK $12.5 million and fully paid off, eliminating possible issues from his bank and the US sanctions.

On 14 October 2020, Lee was listed on a United States Department of State report as one of 10 individuals who materially contributed to the failure of China to meet its obligations under the Sino–British Joint Declaration and Hong Kong's Basic Law.

On 20 April 2022, Lee's YouTube account for his Chief Executive bid, johnlee2022, was removed by Google as they justified that "the move was required by US sanctions" against the ex-security chief. His Facebook and Instagram pages were still functional, but their payment feature was disabled by Meta, who operates the two social media platforms, for reasons similar to Google's. The suspension of Lee's YouTube account was condemned by Foreign Ministry of China spokesperson Wang Wenbin, who accused "certain US companies" of being "political tools" for the U.S. government.

In October 2022, Lee said of the US sanctions that "It is a very barbaric act and I am not going to comment on the effect of such barbaric act" and "We will just laugh off the so-called sanctions."

References

1957 births
Living people
Government officials of Hong Kong
Hong Kong civil servants
Hong Kong police officers
Charles Sturt University alumni
Recipients of the Silver Bauhinia Star
Individuals sanctioned by the United States under the Hong Kong Autonomy Act
Specially Designated Nationals and Blocked Persons List
Hong Kong Roman Catholics
Chief Executives of Hong Kong
Recipients of the Grand Bauhinia Medal